The Alaska Division of Juvenile Justice is a state agency of Alaska that operates juvenile correctional facilities; it is a division of the Alaska Department of Health and Social Services. The agency has its headquarters in Juneau.

Facilities
Facilities include:
 Bethel Youth Facility (Bethel) - Long term confinement and short term detention
 Most residents are Alaska Natives - The geographical area served by the center includes Utqiagvik, Fairbanks, Nome, Kotzebue, and 56 villages of the Yukon-Kuskokwim Delta
 Fairbanks Youth Facility (Fairbanks) - Long term confinement and short term detention
 Johnson Youth Center (Juneau) - Long term confinement and short term detention
 Kenai Peninsula Youth Facility (Kenai)
 Dedicated on September 26, 2003.
 Mat-Su Youth Facility (Palmer)
 McLaughlin Youth Center (Anchorage) - Long term confinement, short term detention, and home supervision
 Nome Youth Facility (Nome) - detention center, can be used for long-term confinement
 Ketchikan Regional Youth Facility (Ketchikan) - detention center and mental health facility. The facility was shut down on August 15, 2016.

References

External links

 Alaska Division of Juvenile Justice

Juvenile detention centers in the United States
Penal system in Alaska
State corrections departments of the United States
Juvenile